Sigma Mu Sigma is a former American college fraternity founded in 1921 at Tri-State University. Sigma Mu Sigma was historically an all-male social fraternity open originally to Master Masons, and later open to all undergraduate male students. As a national fraternity, Sigma Mu Sigma dissolved in 1935 when it was absorbed by Tau Kappa Epsilon. Sigma Mu Sigma was later revived, developed another dozen chapters, and several of these were absorbed by Kappa Sig, Acacia and others. A few remaining chapters of Sigma Mu Sigma transformed into a co-ed service fraternity in 1984 but went defunct around 2020.

Early history
In 1921, Sigma Mu Sigma was founded by three Knights Templar students at Tri-State College in Angola, Indiana. The three founders were Claude Brown, Charles Knapp, and Harold Van Vranken. ΣΜΣ was founded as a fraternity exclusively for Master Masons with a zeal for the promotion of the fraternity's cardinal principles of sincerity, morality, and scholarship. Its founding date was Good Friday, March 25, 1921.  

At the time of the fraternity's founding, Tri-State College had a ban on secret societies; however, several sub-rosa organizations were known to exist on campus. The three founders of ΣΜΣ selected nine other students who were also Master Masons and among the top students at the college. Sigma Mu Sigma announced its formation to administrators and professors of the college. Faced with the possibility of expelling twelve of the top students at Tri-State, the college moved to end its ban on fraternities. 

The fraternity's original intent was to limit membership to Master Masons and to maintain the scholarship standards of Phi Beta Kappa. This was soon found to be impracticable and the Phi Beta Kappa standard was soon dropped.  However, the fraternity did require a high scholarship record of its pledges.

Sigma Mu Sigma became a junior member of the North-American Interfraternity Conference (NIC) in 1928. In 1929, the fraternity's membership requirements were changed to allow both Masons and sons of Masons.

Merger with TKE
In the early 1930s, the United States was in the midst of the Great Depression, resulting in college enrollment and fraternity membership dropping significantly. The effect was especially felt on Sigma Mu Sigma because of the added constraints of its Masonic membership requirement. In the fall of 1934, Sigma Mu Sigma national decided to dissolve itself and allow its chapters to be absorbed by Tau Kappa Epsilon. Sigma Mu Sigma had nine chapters at the time of the decision.

Sigma Mu Sigma's Zeta chapter at Purdue University and the Eta chapter at the University of Illinois merged with existing  chapters at their respective campuses. While these three chapters found a new national affiliation in ΤΚΕ, the remaining chapters did not participate: The Beta, Gamma, Delta, and Theta chapters dissolved. But both Alpha and Iota chapters chose to remain as independent Sigma Mu Sigma chapters without a national organization.

One year later, in 1936, Alpha chapter affiliated with Alpha Lambda Tau, signaling that for some reason, a 1935 merger with ΤΚΕ had been unworkable.  Small nationals were merging or dissolving across the country during this difficult time, however for the Tri-State chapter, the reason may have been that they were unwelcome. At this juncture, chapters at some schools were incompatible with the larger nationals because the NIC (as well as the NPC) required that Full member fraternities may only allow chapters at accredited institutions. ΣΜΣ had been a Junior member; ΤΚΕ was a Full member. Hence, as Tri-State was not yet accredited, the chapter may have realized or been advised it was ineligible for a charter with ΤΚΕ. This may have been the reason it remained local, then joined the smaller national fraternity of Alpha Lambda Tau, also a Junior NIC member. The Iota chapter lingered for a few years, and was inactive by 1940.

Redevelopment
Clyde E. Shaw, a ΣΜΣ brother and faculty member of the Tri-State chapter, revived the fraternity in 1940, four years after his original chapter had joined Alpha Lambda Tau as its Psi chapter. (To complete the story on the original chapter, Alpha Lambda Tau was a small national fraternity that in 1947 would later itself merge into ΤΚΕ as a coincidental, second national merger, that time bringing the Tri-State chapter along with it briefly; but within a year the Tri-State group, now called Beta-Epsilon chapter of ΤΚΕ was forced to return its newly-won charter because of the accreditation problem. The resilient Tri-State group then joined Kappa Sigma Kappa, and was granted a charter from Kappa Sigma just after Tri-State earned accreditation. The chapter survives to the present day.)

Meanwhile, while Shaw's original chapter was proceeding through these several affiliations, his newly-re-established Alpha chapter of Sigma Mu Sigma was reborn through his efforts, and able to successfully navigate the manpower drain of World War II, stabilizing into a thriving chapter as the only existent active group of his re-established fraternity. This chapter, now operating as a local fraternity with the name Sigma Mu Sigma, changed its membership requirements to allow non-Masons to join. Alpha chapter remained the only chapter of ΣΜΣ from 1940 to 1952.

Merger with Sigma Alpha Chi
In August 1952, the Alpha chapter of Sigma Mu Sigma decided to merge with Sigma Alpha Chi, another Masonic fraternity that had been originally known as Square and Compass.

Square and Compass had originated as a club of Master Masons (The Masonic Club) at Washington and Lee University in 1897. Twenty years later, there was interest in a Greek-letter affiliation, but Acacia was unworkable as many of The Masonic Club's members had varied fraternity affiliations. It adopted the name Square and Compass in 1916 and incorporated it on May 12, 1917. Members considered that event to be their formal founding. Square and Compass adopted the Masonic model where interested candidates applied for membership rather than a bidding process. Expansion plans were put on hold, however, as on the eve of World War II, two leaders of the organization left immediately to enter the ROTC. Before the end of the 1917 college year, all of the founders were either in the Army or the Navy.

In the Fall of 1919, Carl A. Foss, the secretary of the fraternity, which was still a local group, returned to Washington and Lee University to complete his education. Foss reorganized the fraternity with the help of Thomas J. Farrar and others. By the beginning of World War II, it had initiated nearly 4,500 members and had expanded to 57 chapters. Square and Compass was inactive for the duration of the war, opening once again for both Masons and sons of Masons. However, a decline in viability during the Great Depression and rising tensions before the war led to a precipitous loss of chapters. Some members lobbied for the adoption of Greek letters as a way of sparking new interest. These pressures prompted Square and Compass to adopt the Greek letter name of Sigma Alpha Chi in 1950; the organization became Square and Compass–Sigma Alpha Chi.

Two years later, on August 3, 1952, Square and Compass and Sigma Mu Sigma voted to merge;  the merged organization became known officially as Sigma Mu Sigma–Square and Compass. The merger linked Sigma Mu Sigma with four chapters from Sigma Alpha Chi and led to another period of moderate growth. The other Square and Compass chapters dissipated.

Recent history
The merger with Sigma Alpha Chi put the fraternity on more solid footing during the 1950s and into the 1960s. This led to the establishment of eight additional chapters. Sigma Mu Sigma marketed itself as a service fraternity from this point, allowing participation by men already active in another social fraternity.  However, anti-establishment attitudes on college campuses of the late 1960s began to put pressure on most college fraternities. 

This was especially true for ΣΜΣ, which had long been linked with socially conservative ideals and the Freemasons. As Baird's explained, "The purpose of the fraternity is to foster the indoctrination of the college men of America with the traditions of their American heritage"  By the early 1970s, this message wasn't as marketable as hoped. At this juncture, many of its chapters began to close or move to other nationals. The Alpha chapter at Tri-State joined Acacia, the largest of the Masonic-influenced fraternities. The Lambda chapter at Elon College joined Kappa Sigma. Other chapters would close, and the Sigma chapter was removed from campus by the administration of Lynchburg College.

Coed evolution 
Under the pressure of these changes, the fraternity took on a new direction. When reestablished in 1984 with the assistance of the Tau chapter at Virginia Tech, the Sigma chapter at Lynchburg College became coed. Sigma Mu Sigma Fraternity remained focused on service, and it allowed both male students to be members as well as female students, known as sisters. The Sigma chapter remained the only chapter of ΣΜΣ until 1989 when they began working to start the Chi chapter at the College of William and Mary. Chi chapter was chartered in November 1990. However, the campus administration formed the Sigma chapter to return to a single-sex, all-male fraternity in 1992. By 2016, the Sigma chapter had gone dormant.

Chapters
Following are the historic chapters of Sigma Mu Sigma. The original fraternity roll of ΣΜΣ included chapters Alpha through Iota. It was re-established by Alpha (Second) which operated as a local under the ΣΜΣ name for twelve years, until the addition of several Sigma Alpha Chi chapters and a second period of moderate growth that lasted until the national was dissipated in the mid-1960s, leaving several surviving locals.  A third iteration of the fraternity with a co-ed model was attempted by the surviving Sigma chapter, now dormant.

Notes

References

Student organizations established in 1921
Freemasonry
Student societies in the United States
Defunct former members of the North American Interfraternity Conference
1921 establishments in Indiana